Timothy John Rushton MBE (born 18 March 1963 in England) is a British choreographer and from 2001 to 2018 artistic leader of the Copenhagen-based Danish Dance Theatre, Denmark's largest modern dance company.

Tim Rushton was trained at The Royal Ballet School in Covent Garden, London, from 1979 to 1982, studying with Erik Bruhn, Frederick Ashton and Kenneth MacMillan. Later he danced with the Sadler's Wells Royal Ballet, now known as the Birmingham Royal Ballet. He was engaged at Deutsche Oper am Rhein between 1982 and 1986, Malmö Stadsteater 1986-1987 and the Royal Danish Ballet 1987–1992. While a dancer at the Royal Danish Ballet he became interested in pursuing a choreographic career and decided to quit dancing.

Tim Rushton quickly made his marks as a choreographer, combining classical ballet technique with modern dance, and in 2001 he was appointed Artistic Director of the Danish Dance Theatre. As one of Northern Europe's leading choreographers, his choreographies have received thirteen nominations for – and four times won: 1999, 2005, 2006 and 2009 – that country's Reumert Prize.

As artistic leader of Danish Dance Theatre Rushton collaborated with writers, designers, visual artists and composers. He worked with a wide range of music spanning diverse genres, from classical masterpieces through to beat, jazz and newly commissioned compositions.

Further to Danish Dance Theatre's performances in Denmark, the company was touring extensively worldwide in Europe, Asia as well as in the United States.

Tim Rushton was appointed Member of the Order of the British Empire (MBE) in the 2011 New Year Honours for services to dance. He is listed in Kraks Blå Bog, the Danish Who's Who.

Choreography 
  
1995 La Lune Blanche
1995 Act of Faith
1998 Udflugt i det blå
1998 Refrain
1998 Sweet Complaint
1999 Busy Being Blue
1999 Clavigo
2000 Caught in the Act
2000 Schadenfreude
2000 Den Røde Ballon
2000 Nomade
2000 Monkey Business
2000 Dominium
 
2000 C´est Moi
2001 Shadowland
2001 Microcosmos
2002 Working Man
2002 Belá
2003 Napoli - den nye by
2004 Graffiti
2005 Silent Steps
2005 Kridt
2006 Confessions
2006 Insomnia
2006 Requiem
2007 Passion
 
2008 Labyrinth
2010 Enigma
2011 Monolith
2012 Walking in the night
2013 Den røde Ballon
2013 Le Sacre du Printemps
2013 Rød
2013 Love Songs
2014 Black Diamond
2014 Stormen
2014 The Diary of a Madman
2015 Carmina Burana
2016 ''Ildfuglen

References

English choreographers
Danish choreographers
British male ballet dancers
People educated at the Royal Ballet School
English expatriates in Denmark
1963 births
Living people
 
Members of the Order of the British Empire